This is a timeline documenting events of jazz in the year 2020.

Events 

May 6 – Gregory Porter's brother Lloyd dies of COVID-19, two months after the singer is forced to interrupt his world tour by the pandemic.
August 6-8 – The Newport Jazz Festival is replaced by a programme of virtual events created by founder  George Wein.

Albums
Pat Metheny – From This Place
Joshua Redman - RoundAgain
Dinosaur – To the Earth
John Scofield and Steve Swallow - Swallow Tales
Carla Bley - Life Goes On

Deaths
January 10 – Wolfgang Dauner, 84, German jazz pianist
February 10 – Lyle Mays, 66, American jazz fusion keyboardist (Pat Metheny Group)
February 16 – Graeme Allwright, 93, New Zealand-French folk and jazz singer-songwriter
February 18 – Jon Christensen, 76m Norwegian jazz drummer
March 2 – Susan Weinert, 54, German jazz fusion guitarist (cancer)
March 6 – McCoy Tyner, 81, American jazz pianist
March 10 – Marcelo Peralta, 59, Argentine jazz saxophonist (COVID-19)
April 1 - Ellis Marsalis, Jr., 85, American jazz pianist and educator
April 15 - Lee Konitz, 92, American jazz saxophonist
October 17 – Toshinori Kondo, 71, Japanese jazz and jazz fusion trumpeter
October 31 – Marc Fosset, 71, French jazz guitarist
November 1 – Pedro Iturralde, 91, Spanish jazz saxophonist
November 7 – Cándido Camero, 99, Cuban jazz percussionist
November 11 – Andrew White, 78, American jazz saxophonist
November 26 – Allan Botschinsky, 80, Danish jazz trumpeter
December 30 – Eugene Wright, 97, American jazz bassist (Dave Brubeck Quartet)

See also

 List of 2020 albums
 List of jazz festivals
 List of years in jazz
 2020s in jazz
 2020 in music

References

External links 

2020s in jazz
Jazz
Jazz